Sir George Henry Richards  (13 January 182014 November 1896) was Hydrographer of the Royal Navy from 1863 to 1874.

Biography 
Richards was born in Antony, Cornwall, the son of Captain G. S. Richards, and joined the Royal Navy in 1832. His eldest son, George Edward Richards also became a Royal Navy officer and hydrographic surveyor.

Naval career 
He served in South America, the Falkland Islands, New Zealand, Australia and in the First Opium War in China.

Survey work in Canada 

He was the second British commissioner to the San Juan Islands Boundary Commission and a hydrographer on the coast of British Columbia in 1857–1862. He is responsible for the selection and designation of dozens of placenames along the British Columbia coast. In the Vancouver area, for example, he named False Creek. In 1859, after his engineer Francis Brockton found a vein of coal, he named Brockton Point and the area of Coal Harbour. In 1860, he named Mount Garibaldi after Giuseppe Garibaldi. Other landmarks in the area named by him are the Britannia Range, and Brunswick Mountain and many features in the Howe Sound, Sunshine Coast, and Jervis Inlet areas.

In 1863 he was appointed Hydrographer to the Navy and held that position until 1874 when he retired. At a time when the merchant navy was expanding rapidly and telegraphic underwater cable laying operations were intensifying, the Admiralty had a great need for more accurate ocean charts. It was in this context that Richards was asked to organise the scientific cruises of the H.M.S. Porcupine and the H.M.S. Lightning between 1868 and 1870, followed by that of the H.M.S. Challenger.

Later life 
He was elected a Fellow of the Royal Society in June 1866 and a corresponding member of the French Academy of Sciences in the same year. He was knighted in 1877, became a Knight Commander of the Order of the Bath in 1881 and became an admiral in 1884. He died in Bath, Somerset aged 76.

A portrait of him by Stephen Pearce, dated 1865, hangs in the National Portrait Gallery in London. Mount Richards in Waterton Lakes National Park in Alberta, Canada is named in his honor.

References

Further reading

External links 

1819 births
1896 deaths
English explorers of North America
English hydrographers
Explorers of British Columbia
Fellows of the Royal Society
Hydrographers of the Royal Navy
Knights Bachelor
Knights Commander of the Order of the Bath
People from Antony, Cornwall
Pre-Confederation British Columbia people
Royal Navy officers